The Nepal hostage crisis began on 19 August 2004 when an Iraqi Sunni insurgent group, Jamaat Ansar al-Sunna kidnapped and murdered twelve Nepalis.

Events 

Moonlight Consultancy Private Limited, company based in Nepal, recruited twelve Nepalis to work in Amman, Jordan as chefs, cleaners and builders for Jordanian businesses. On 19 August 2004, they were transported to Iraq by a caravan using the Amman-Baghdad Highway. The same they were kidnapped by an Iraqi Sunni insurgent group, Jamaat Ansar al-Sunna. On 20 August, the group released a video of the hostages which showed them begging for their lives and blaming Pralhad Giri of Moonlight Consultants for their abduction; the media was aired by various Nepali channels. On 23 August, the Government of Nepal made a plead via the Al Jazeera television channel, however, Nepali diplomats were unable to contact the kidnappers. The Nepali government also wrote to the Iraqi government, nevertheless, on 31 August at 6 pm, television channels broadcast pictures of the dead bodies of 12 Nepalis.

In a video later posted by the militants to jihadist websites online the hostages are shown being executed, with one beheaded and the rest shot dead.

Hostages 
Sources:

 Sanjay Kumar Thakur
 Budan Kumar Shah
 Lalan Singh Koirala
 Manoj Kumar Thakur
 Jhok Bahadur Thapa
 Jit Bahadur Thapa
 Ramesh Khadka
 Mangal Bahadur Limbu
 Bishnu Hari Thapa
 Rajendra Kumar Shrestha
 Gyanendra Shrestha
 Prakash Adhikari

Aftermath

Riots 
Riots in Nepal began shortly after the hostages were killed. Thousands of people rioted in cities and towns across Nepal, which saw looting, arson, as well as imposed curfew and the deaths of two people. Several violent clashes with police followed the crisis, along with vandalism of Kantipur Publications, Kantipur Television, Space Time Network, and Channel Nepal. The Nepal Association of Foreign Employment Agencies was reported to have lost about billions of Nepali Rupees (NPR), and various companies also lost about 750 million NPR in damages.

Reactions 
King Gyanendra and Queen Komal expressed their "condolences to the family and relatives of the people killed by Iraqi militants". It was reported that they were "shocked and grieved" by the cruel acts made by Jamaat Ansar al-Sunna. On 1 September, Prime Minister Sher Bahadur Deuba gave a nationwide speech on Radio Nepal and he called for "restraint". Deuba stated he would also provide 1 million Nepalese rupees to victims' family, and proclaimed 2 September to be a national day of mourning.

It was also condemned by Indian Prime Minister: Manmohan Singh, United States Secretary of State: Colin Powell, Minister of External Affairs: Natwar Singh, Jack Straw, Pope John Paul II, governments of Bangladesh and Japan. The Kathmandu Post called the militants "terrorists who have camouflaged themselves in the masks of Islam".

Lawsuit

In the media 

 In 2018, Cam Simpson published non-fiction book The Girl From Kathmandu: Twelve Dead Men and a Woman's Quest for Justice which documents this incident.

References

External links 
Nepalis killed in Iraq: A Documentary of Memories at YouTube

2004 in Iraq
2004 in Nepal
Diplomatic incidents
Filmed executions in Iraq
Foreign hostages in Iraq
Mass murder in 2004
Nepal–Iraq relations
Islamism-related beheadings
Beheading videos